Kayadere can refer to:

 Kayadere, Çanakkale
 Kayadere, Silvan